Alice Roi (born Alice Roy Blumenthal in 1976) is an American fashion designer. Her work has appeared in magazines such as Bazaar, Elle, Nylon, and in stores like Henri Bendel (New York), Beauty Buy (Paris), and Joyce (Hong Kong). She was nominated for the CFDA Perry Ellis Award for Womenswear in 2001.

Education

Her father, Jerry Blumenthal, died when she was 12.  Her mother Naomi runs The Inn at Irving Place. She developed her love for fashion as a young child, putting on fashion shows for family and friends and putting together outfits.

After graduating from Friends Seminary,  she earned a bachelor's degree in Fine Arts from New York University, and went on to continue her studies at Parsons School of Design.

Career

Following a stint at Elle magazine, she worked as a fashion consultant. Wanting to be more creative, she set up her own design house and launched her collection in New York 1999. Roi's collection was quickly picked up by Kirna Zabete in New York.

Her "punky yet girlish" look developed a following. Cathy Horyn of The New York Times praised her for the "unique world" created by her "a delicious sartorial joke sense that has grown more and more sophisticated".

In 2007, she worked with Japanese retailer Uniqlo. The following year, Roi, Laura Poretzky and Shoshanna Lonstein Gruss collaborated on a Supergirl line for Warner Brothers. She has dressed celebrities such as Liv Tyler and Mary Lynn Rajskub of 24.

She continues to design in her Manhattan studio.

References

External links
Website

Alice Roi at style.com

1976 births
Living people
American fashion designers
American women fashion designers
New York University alumni
Artists from New York City
Friends Seminary alumni
21st-century American women